Jack Carroll (born 18 October 1998) is an English comedian and actor. He competed in the seventh series of Britain's Got Talent at the age of 14, finishing as the runner-up. As an actor, he appeared in two series of the CBBC series Ministry of Curious Stuff and from 2014 to 2018, he starred in the Sky sitcom Trollied. Carroll, whose cerebral palsy is often a subject of his act, won a Pride of Britain award in 2012.

Comedy career
In 2010, at the age of 12, Carroll came to comedian Jason Manford's attention when he saw a video of Carroll performing at his parents' wedding anniversary. At Manford's invitation, Carroll gave a short performance at the start of Manford's live show in front of more than 1,400 people at St. George's Hall in Bradford. The performance was featured on a segment of BBC One's The One Show. He performed with Manford again on
21 and 22 June 2013 at the Victoria Theatre in Halifax.

Acting career
In early 2012, Carroll was cast as Mr. Frazernagle in Ministry of Curious Stuff on the CBBC Channel, which starred Vic Reeves, and has appeared in two series of the show.

On 4 May 2014, it was announced that Carroll would appear in an episode of the BBC One sitcom Big School playing Dean, a new student at Greybridge School. He appeared in the fifth episode of the second series (broadcast 3 October 2014).

On 6 June 2014, Carroll was cast in the fourth series of Sky1 comedy show Trollied, in the role of Harry.

Carroll made a guest appearance in the BBC One daytime soap Doctors on 10 March 2015. He also made his acting  debut on the 4 O'Clock Club as a pupil thinking of joining Elmsmere.

He plays the role of Pete in the 2019 film Eaten by Lions.

In August 2019, Carroll appeared in Episode 1 of series 7 of Father Brown, where he portrayed Tim Cudlip, the younger brother of two would-be train robbers.

In 2020, it was announced Carroll had been cast to make his theatrical debut in Cured, a play about a religious pilgrimage. The play is expected to open in Liverpool's Royal Court theatre in 2022 before touring the UK.

Britain's Got Talent

Carroll was a contestant on the seventh series of Britain's Got Talent in 2013. At his first audition, screened on 13 April, the judges unanimously voted him through to the next round. He was later put through to the live semi-finals. Carroll appeared on the second live semi-final on 28 May, winning the show with 42.5 percent of the public vote.

He performed once again at the final on 8 June. At the end of the competition, Carroll finished in second place after receiving 20.1 percent of the vote, behind Hungarian shadow theatre group Attraction with 27 percent.

Other work
After the Britain's Got Talent final, Carroll signed a deal with Simon Cowell's company Syco to write an autobiography.

Carroll has appeared on the CBBC shows The Dog Ate My Homework and Sam & Mark's Big Friday Wind-Up. In 2015, he made guest appearances in Sunday Night at the Palladium and Jason Manford's It's a Funny Old Week.  In 2016, Carroll performed a "sit-down" routine on the BBC Two series Live at the Apollo. In 2017, Carroll appeared on the BBC Radio 4 topical comedy show, The Now Show.

In September 2016, Carroll performed at the Keep Corbyn rally in Brighton in support of Jeremy Corbyn's campaign in the Labour Party leadership election.

Personal life
Carroll was born 11 weeks prematurely and he developed cerebral palsy. In 2012, he won a Pride of Britain Award in the "Teenager of Courage"  category.

Carroll lives in Hipperholme, West Yorkshire, with his parents. He is a Leeds United F.C fan and on 31 August 2013, he performed at Elland Road at the launch of the club's Families United initiative.

Filmography

References

External links

 Jack Carroll on Twitter
 

1998 births
Living people
Actors with disabilities
Britain's Got Talent contestants
Comedians from Yorkshire
English male child actors
English male television actors
English stand-up comedians
English television personalities
People educated at Brighouse High School
People with cerebral palsy
Wheelchair users